Mount Laussedat is a  mountain summit located in the Canadian Rockies of British Columbia, Canada. It is the highest point in the Southwest Central Park Ranges. The first ascent of the mountain was made in 1906 by C. B. Sissons, Arthur Oliver Wheeler, and M. Wheeler. The peak was named in 1911 by surveyor Arthur Oliver Wheeler for Aimé Laussedat (1819-1907), a French military officer whose pioneering photographic surveying techniques were used by Wheeler and Canada's Interprovincial Boundary Surveyors. The mountain's name was officially adopted March 31, 1924, when approved by the Geographical Names Board of Canada.


Climate
Based on the Köppen climate classification, Mount Laussedat is located in a subarctic climate zone with cold, snowy winters, and mild summers. Temperatures can drop below −20 °C with wind chill factors below −30 °C. Precipitation runoff from the mountain drains north into Waitabit Creek, or south into the Blaeberry River, which are both tributaries of the Columbia River.

See also
 Geology of the Rocky Mountains
 List of mountains in the Canadian Rockies

References

External links
 Weather: Mount Laussedat
 Wikipédia Français: Aimé Laussedat
 Laussedat, Aimé: Encyclopedia.com

Three-thousanders of British Columbia
Canadian Rockies
Columbia Country
Kootenay Land District